Clouds Rising Into the Lotus Flowers ( 云上莲花 ) is a chant for soprano and orchestra,
composed by He Xuntian in 2008.

Inspiration

 Clouds Rising Into the Lotus Flowers was inspired from Shakyamuni's sutra:
na mo a mi da ba ya
da ta ga da ya 
da d ya ta 
a mi li dou ba wei 
a mi li da xi dan ba wei 
a mi li da wei ge lan di 
a mi li da wei ge lan da ga mi ni 
ga ga na gei di ga li 
si wa ha

First performance
 Clouds Rising Into the Lotus Flowers
Soprano: Huang Ying
Dirigent: James Judd 
Orchester: Israel Symphony Orchestra
8 November 2014,Shanghai  
Concert Hall, Oriental Art Center

References

External links
Clouds Rising Into the Lotus Flowers published by Schott Music International, Germany

Compositions by He Xuntian
Songs in classical music
2008 compositions